HMS Pembroke was a fifth rate built under the 1689 programme built at Deptford Dockyard. Her guns were listed under old terms for guns as demi-culverines, sakers and minions. After commissioning she spent her short career in Home Waters and the West Indies. She was taken by the French and runashore in 1694.

Pembroke was the second name vessel since it was used for a 28-gun ship launched at Woolwich and sunk due to a collision with Fairfax off Portland in 1667.

Construction
She was ordered on 28 June 1689 from Deptford Dockyard to be built under the guidance of Master Shipwright Fisher Harding. She was launched on 3 March 1690.

Commissioned Service
She was commissioned in 1690 under the command of Captain John Every, RN for service with the Fleet. She was off the Scottish coast in 1691. Her next commander was Captain George Warren, RN for service in Wheeler's squadron in the West Indies. With the death of Captain Warren on 20 April 1693, Captain Francis Hisley, RN took command until he died on 2 May 1693. On 17 January 1694 she came under command of Captain Rodger Bellwood, RN,

Loss
HMS Pembroke was taken by a 40-gun French privateer Le Louis off the Lizard on 23 February 1694 then run ashore.

Notes

Citations

References
 Winfield 2009, British Warships in the Age of Sail (1603 – 1714), by Rif Winfield, published by Seaforth Publishing, England © 2009, EPUB , Chapter 5, The Fifth Rates, Vessels acquired from 16 December 1688, Fifth Rates of 32 and 36 guns, 1689 Programme, Pembroke
 Colledge, Ships of the Royal Navy, by J.J. Colledge, revised and updated by Lt Cdr Ben Warlow and Steve Bush, published by Seaforth Publishing, Barnsley, Great Britain, © 2020, EPUB , Section P (Pembroke)

 

Frigates of the Royal Navy
Ships built in Deptford
Ships of the Royal Navy
1690s ships